Sheka Sorie Fofanah (born 2 January 1998) is a Sierra Leonean international footballer who plays as a forward for Diyala and the Sierra Leone national team.

Club career
Having started his career with Sierra Leone National Premier League side Freetown City, Fofanah signed for Danish 1st Division side Vejle Boldklub in 2016, after trialing with Swedish champions IFK Norrköping. He made his debut in a 3–1 Danish Cup victory against Tjæreborg IF.

He signed for Czech First League side Jablonec in 2017, joining up with the junior team. However, he signed for Czech second division side Frýdek-Místek only months later.

International career
Fofanah made his international debut in a 1–1 draw with Malawi. He scored his first goal in his second game, a 2–1 defeat to Gabon. His second goal came against Sudan, in a 1–0 victory in 2017 Africa Cup of Nations qualification.

Career statistics

Club

Notes

International

International goals
Scores and results list Sierra Leone's goal tally first.

References

External links
 

1998 births
Living people
Sierra Leonean footballers
Sierra Leonean expatriate footballers
Sierra Leone international footballers
Association football forwards
Danish 1st Division players
Czech First League players
Oman Professional League players
Saudi Second Division players
FK Jablonec players
Vejle Boldklub players
FK Frýdek-Místek players
Al-Merrikh SC players
Al-Nasr SC (Salalah) players
Al-Mina'a SC players
Al Jandal Club players
People from Koidu
Expatriate men's footballers in Denmark
Expatriate footballers in the Czech Republic
Expatriate footballers in Sudan
Expatriate footballers in Oman
Expatriate footballers in Iraq
Expatriate footballers in Saudi Arabia